Jagdish Prasad Singh is an Indian writer who writes in Hindi and English languages. The Government of India honoured him, in 2013, by awarding him Padma Shri, the fourth highest civilian award, for his contributions to the field of literature.

Biography
Jagdish Prasad Singh hails from Mirganj village in Rohtas district of Bihar, in India. He is a faculty member of Magadh University, Bodh gaya in Bihar, in the Department of English, and is credited with 10 novels and over 200 short stories in Hindi 7 novels in English and three critical studies. Some of his notable works are The Curfew, Ganga Snan, Godhuli and Visangati.

References

External links

Further reading
 
 
 
 

Living people
Recipients of the Padma Shri in literature & education
Novelists from Bihar
20th-century Indian short story writers
20th-century Indian novelists
People from Rohtas District
Year of birth missing (living people)